Șerban Constantin Valeca (23 June 1956–15 May 2022) was a Romanian politician. A member of the Social Democratic Party (PSD), he served in the Senate of Romania from 2008 to 2020. He died in Ștefănești, Argeș on 15 May 2022 at the age of 65.

References 

1956 births
2022 deaths
21st-century Romanian politicians
Romanian physicians
Social Democratic Party (Romania) politicians
Members of the Senate of Romania
Members of the Chamber of Deputies (Romania)
Politehnica University of Bucharest alumni
Politicians from Bucharest